Perkins County is a county located in the U.S. state of Nebraska. As of the 2010 United States Census, the population was 2,970. Its county seat is Grant.

In the Nebraska license plate system, Perkins County is represented by the prefix 74 (it had the seventy-fourth-largest number of vehicles registered in the county when the license plate system was established in 1922).

History
Perkins County was organized in 1887. It is believed to have been named for Charles E. Perkins, the president of the Chicago, Burlington and Quincy Railroad.

Geography
Perkins County lies on the southwest side of Nebraska. Its west boundary line abuts the east boundary line of the state of Colorado. The county terrain consists of arid, low rolling hills. The planar areas are used for agriculture, usually employing center pivot irrigation. The land slopes to the southeast.

Most of Nebraska's 93 counties (the eastern 2/3) observe Central Time; the western counties (including Perkins) observe Mountain Time. Perkins County is the easternmost of the Nebraska counties to observe Mountain Time.

Major highways
  Nebraska Highway 23
  Nebraska Highway 61

Adjacent counties

 Lincoln County – east (observes Central Time)
 Hayes County – southeast (observes Central Time)
 Chase County – south
 Phillips County, Colorado – southwest
 Sedgwick County, Colorado – west
 Deuel County – northwest
 Keith County – north

Demographics

As of the 2000 United States Census there were 3,200 people, 1,275 households, and 893 families in the county. The population density was 4 people per square mile (1/km2).  There were 1,444 housing units at an average density of 2 per square mile (1/km2). The racial makeup of the county was 97.69% White, 0.03% Black or African American, 0.28% Native American, 0.22% Asian, 1.34% from other races, and 0.44% from two or more races. 2.31% of the population were Hispanic or Latino of any race.

There were 1,275 households, out of which 32.50% had children under the age of 18 living with them, 62.90% were married couples living together, 4.60% had a female householder with no husband present, and 29.90% were non-families. 27.50% of all households were made up of individuals, and 15.70% had someone living alone who was 65 years of age or older. The average household size was 2.47 and the average family size was 3.01.

The county population contained 26.60% under the age of 18, 6.00% from 18 to 24, 23.50% from 25 to 44, 24.70% from 45 to 64, and 19.30% who were 65 years of age or older. The median age was 41 years. For every 100 females there were 100.80 males. For every 100 females age 18 and over, there were 95.80 males.

The median income for a household in the county was $34,205, and the median income for a family was $42,112. Males had a median income of $28,438 versus $19,881 for females. The per capita income for the county was $17,830. About 9.50% of families and 13.60% of the population were below the poverty line, including 20.10% of those under age 18 and 8.90% of those age 65 or over.

Communities

City
 Grant (county seat)

Villages
 Elsie
 Madrid
 Venango

Unincorporated communities
 Brandon
 Grainton

Politics
Perkins County voters are reliably Republican. In no national election since 1936 has the county selected the Democratic Party candidate (as of 2020).

See also
 National Register of Historic Places listings in Perkins County NE

External links
 County chamber of commerce

References

 
1887 establishments in Nebraska
Populated places established in 1887